The Metropolitan Correctional Center, San Diego (MCC San Diego) is a United States federal administrative detention facility in California which holds male and female prisoners of all security levels. It is operated by the Federal Bureau of Prisons, a division of the United States Department of Justice.

Most prisoners held at MCC San Diego have pending cases in the United States District Court for the Southern District of California. MCC San Diego also holds prisoners serving brief sentences. MCC San Diego is an administrative facility designed to house federal prisoners of all security levels, including both male and female offenders. The building is 23 stories and can house 1,300 inmates.

History
MCC San Diego opened in December 1974 and represented the first shift within the Bureau of Prisons to a new generation of high-rise prison buildings, along with MCC New York and MCC Chicago.

Notable incidents
On March 18, 2011, the office of Laura E. Duffy, the US Attorney for the Southern District of California, announced that Brandon McKinney, a former correctional officer at MCC San Diego, had been indicted on suspicion of having sexual relations with a female inmate while on duty on July 20, 2010. Since sexual relationships between prison staff and inmates are prohibited by law regardless of consent, McKinney was terminated and charged with assault. McKinney subsequently pleaded guilty and was sentenced to 10 months in prison on August 10, 2012.

Duffy's office issued a press release on July 18, 2013 announcing that Kirk Borja, an inmate at MCC San Diego, had pleaded guilty to conspiring to distribute methamphetamine and possessing heroin with the intent to distribute it. Borja was originally indicted on the methamphetamine trafficking charge following his arrest in January 2012 as part of Operation Carnalismo, an investigation into the Mexican Mafia gang. Borja also admitted in his plea to concealing heroin inside his body while he was at MCC San Diego and planning to distribute it to other inmates before it was discovered by correctional officers. Borja is still being held at MCC San Diego pending sentencing.

Notable inmates (current and former)

See also

List of U.S. federal prisons
Federal Bureau of Prisons
Incarceration in the United States

References

External links
 MCC San Diego

Skyscrapers in San Diego
San Diego
Prisons in California
Skyscrapers in California
1974 establishments in California